Events in the year 1664 in Norway.

Incumbents
Monarch: Frederick III

Events
January – Ulrik Frederik Gyldenløve is appointed Steward of Norway.

Arts and literature

Births
11 March – Jørgen Otto Brockenhuus, military officer (d.1728)
10 May – Tørres Christensen, merchant, ship owner, land owner (died 1721).

Deaths
5 February – Henning Stockfleth, clergyman (born 1610).
19 February – Hans Stockfleth, civil servant.

See also

References